The Summer Olympics are the world's largest multi-sport event, and are organized by the International Olympic Committee (IOC) every four years. Selection of the host city is done at an IOC Session four to seven years prior to the tournament, in which the IOC members vote between candidate cities which have submitted bids. As of the selection of the 2016 Olympics, 28 games have been held in 22 cities in 19 countries. Bids have been made by 64 cities in 34 countries.

The bid process consists of two rounds. First, cities and national Olympic committees (NOCs) may show their interest and submit a preliminary bid, becoming applicant cities. Through analysis of the questionnaires, the IOC gave a weighted-average score to each city based on the scores obtained in each of the questionnaire's eleven themes: political and social support, general infrastructure, sports venues, Olympic Village, environment, accommodation, transport, security, past experience, finance, and legacy. IOC's executive committee then selects a short-list of candidate cities. The candidate cities are investigated by the IOC Evaluation Committee, who make an evaluation report. These submit a more extensive bid book and are subject to additional evaluation, which is presented to the IOC members. Voting occurs as an exhaustive ballot, which may occur through multiple rounds until a single city holds a majority of the votes. IOC members from a candidate NOC may not vote in any round while their country remains in the election.

The first three games were not subject to bids; the first IOC Session, in 1894, awarded the first games to Athens (1896) and Paris (1900), respectively. The 1904 Olympics were initially awarded to Chicago, but then moved to St. Louis to be co-located with the World Fair. A system with bids was introduced ahead of the 1908 Olympics, and were awarded to Rome. After the 1906 eruption of Mount Vesuvius, Italy returned the games to IOC, which awarded them to London. The 1916 Olympics were awarded to Berlin, but canceled due to the First World War. The 1940 Olympics were originally awarded to Tokyo, but after the 1938 break-out of the Second Sino-Japanese War, they were returned to the IOC, who awarded them to Helsinki. The games, and the 1944 Olympics awarded to London, were ultimately canceled due to the Second World War. The 1956 Olympics were awarded to Melbourne, but Australian horse quarantine rules forced the equestrian events to be held in Stockholm. Three times there have been only a single bid, Stockholm in 1912, and Los Angeles in 1932 and 1984. Starting with the 2004 Olympics, only the highest-rated cities are short-listed for the final IOC vote.

Paris and Los Angeles - who will host the games in 2024 and 2028 respectively - will join London as the only cities to host three Olympic Games. London, Antwerp, Munich and Sydney are the only cities to never have failed at winning a bid. St. Louis is the only city to have hosted the games without submitting a bid. Helsinki, Minneapolis, Montreal and Munich have bid for both Summer and Winter Olympics; all but Minneapolis have succeeded at winning Summer bids, but none have held Winter Olympics. Detroit is the most unsuccessful city, having failed seven times. Los Angeles has made the most bids, succeeding three times and failing six times. Amsterdam, Budapest and Lausanne have all failed five times. The United States has made the most bids, having bid for 22 games, including all games from 1944 through 1984.

By year
The following is a list of bids for the Summer Olympics, sorted by year. It consists of the year the games were held or scheduled to be held, the date the decision was made, the city and country which issued the bid, the votes at the IOC Session for each voting round, and the ultimate host of the games. The bid listed first for each games is the one selected by the IOC, whether or not it ultimately hosted the games.

By city
The following is a list of bids submitted by city. It lists the county, city, and year for which failed, withdrawn, and successful bids were submitted. A parenthesis indicates that the city was awarded the games without a bidding process. A dagger indicates that the city was awarded the games, but that they were ultimately not held in the city, either because the games were canceled or moved. An asterisk (*) indicates that the bid was not shortlisted. A double asterisk (**) indicates that the bid was withdrawn.

By country
The following is a list of bids submitted by national Olympic committee, listing the country and years it bid. Only countries that have submitted bids from multiple cities are included. Successful bids are in boldface. A parenthesis indicates that the city was awarded the games without a bidding process. A dagger indicates that the city was awarded the games, but that they were ultimately not held in the city, either because the games were canceled or moved.

See also 
 Bids for Olympic Games
 List of bids for the Winter Olympics

Notes

 
Olympic Summer bids
Summer Olympics
Bids Summer